30 on the Rail is the debut solo studio album by Hootie & the Blowfish lead guitarist Mark Bryan.  Released in March 2000, every song on the album was written exclusively by Bryan, with the exception of "City by a River", which is credited to Hootie & the Blowfish.

Track listing 
All songs written by Mark Bryan, unless noted otherwise
 "If It Happens" – 2:56
 "All That I Believe" – 3:29
 "The Story Goes On" – 3:36
 "City by a River" – 5:38 ''(Dean Felber, Darius Rucker, Jim Sonefeld, and Mark Williams)
 "Last Light" – 4:15
 "Together in Our Minds" – 3:47
 "Drinkin’ You Pretty" – 2:56
 "I’ll Fade Away" – 3:42
 "Fall into Fall, Pt. 2" – 3:09
 "Just Takes Time" – 4:17
 "Halfway to Nowhere" – 2:03
 "2 Guys Named Tim" – 3:16
 "She Stays in Love" – 2:37

Personnel 
 Mark Bryan – lead vocal
 Don Dixon, Hank Futch, Danielle Howle – Additional vocals
 Mark Bryan, Don Dixon – guitar
 Don Dixon, Hank Futch, Andy Ware – bass
 Steve Hill, Fred LeBlanc – drums
 Peter Holsapple – accordion
 Dwayne Ellen – banjo
 Don Dixon – bass, guitar
 Claire Bryant – cello
 Gary Greene – congas
 Greg Humphries – electric guitar
 Peter Holsapple– harmonica
 Fred LeBlanc – hollers
 Steve Lipton – mandolin
 Peter Holsapple – organ, piano, recorder, wurlitzer piano, vibraphone
 Gary Greene – tambourine
 Dan Cook – violin
 Mark Bryan – art direction, design
 Christina Dittmar – art direction, design
 Mark Williams – engineer
 Gerald Harbarth – illustrations
 Jim Sonefeld – photography

References 

2000 debut albums
Mark Bryan albums
Albums produced by Don Dixon (musician)
Atlantic Records albums